The 1991 NCAA Men's Water Polo Championship was the 23rd annual NCAA Men's Water Polo Championship to determine the national champion of NCAA men's collegiate water polo. Tournament matches were played at the Belmont Plaza Pool in Long Beach, California during December 1991.

California defeated UCLA in the final, 7–6, to win their tenth, and second consecutive, national title. Coached by Steve Heaston, the Golden Bears finished the season 26–1.

The Most Outstanding Player of the tournament was, for the second straight year, Chris Humbert from California. Humbert, along with six other players, was named to the All-Tournament Team.

The tournament's leading scorer, with 11 goals, was Steve Gill from UC Irvine.

Qualification
Since there has only ever been one single national championship for water polo, all NCAA men's water polo programs (whether from Division I, Division II, or Division III) were eligible. A total of 8 teams were invited to contest this championship. This was the first time that two non-Division I programs (Slippery Rock and UC San Diego) qualified for the same tournament.

Bracket
Site: Belmont Plaza Pool, Long Beach, California

{{8TeamBracket-Consols
| team-width=150
| RD3=First round
| RD4=Championship semifinals
| RD2=Consolation semifinals
| RD5=Championship
| RD5b=Third place
| RD1=Fifth place
| RD1b=Seventh place

| RD3-seed1= | RD3-team1=California | RD3-score1=13
| RD3-seed2= | RD3-team2=Navy | RD3-score2=6
| RD3-seed3= | RD3-team3=UC Irvine | RD3-score3=11| RD3-seed4= | RD3-team4=Long Beach State | RD3-score4=8
| RD3-seed5= | RD3-team5=UCLA | RD3-score5=14| RD3-seed6= | RD3-team6=UC San Diego | RD3-score6=10
| RD3-seed7= | RD3-team7=Pepperdine | RD3-score7=18| RD3-seed8= | RD3-team8= Slippery Rock | RD3-score8=9

| RD4-seed1= | RD4-team1=California | RD4-score1=13| RD4-seed2= | RD4-team2=UC Irvine | RD4-score2=10
| RD4-seed3= | RD4-team3=UCLA| RD4-score3=6| RD4-seed4= | RD4-team4=Pepperdine | RD4-score4=5

| RD2-seed1= | RD2-team1=Navy | RD2-score1=9
| RD2-seed2= | RD2-team2=Long Beach State | RD2-score2=13
| RD2-seed3= | RD2-team3=UC San Diego | RD2-score3=12| RD2-seed4= | RD2-team4=Slippery Rock | RD2-score4=10

| RD5-seed1= | RD5-team1=California | RD5-score1=7| RD5-seed2= | RD5-team2=UCLA | RD5-score2=6

| RD5b-seed1= | RD5b-team1=UC Irvine | RD5b-score1=7
| RD5b-seed2= | RD5b-team2=Pepperdine | RD5b-score2=9| RD1-seed1= | RD1-team1=Long Beach State | RD1-score1=12
| RD1-seed2= | RD1-team2=UC San Diego| RD1-score2=10

| RD1b-seed1= | RD1b-team1=Navy | RD1b-score1=8
| RD1b-seed2= | RD1b-team2=Slippery Rock | RD1b-score2=9}}

 All-tournament team Chris Humbert, California''' (Most outstanding player)
Jason Brown, UC San Diego
Mike Burke, Long Beach State
 Geoffrey Clark, Pepperdine
Steve Gill, UC Irvine
Dan Hackett, UCLA
Oliver Will, UCLA

See also 
 NCAA Men's Water Polo Championship

References

NCAA Men's Water Polo Championship
NCAA Men's Water Polo Championship
1991 in sports in California
December 1991 sports events in the United States
1991